Slim Willet (Winston Lee Moore, December 1, 1919, Dublin, Texas – July 1, 1966) was an American disc jockey, musician, and songwriter.

He attended Hardin-Simmons University in Abilene and graduated in 1949 with a degree in journalism. He got a job as a country music deejay at Abilene radio station KRBC, where he worked until 1956. While there, he formed his own ensemble, the Hired Hands. Taking the stage name Slim Willet, he released his debut single in 1950 with "Tool Pusher from Snyder". The group appeared on the Big D Jamboree in Dallas on WFAA until 1954, as well as on Louisiana Hayride from 1951 to 1955. He released several hit singles during this time, among them "Red Rose", "No Love Song to You", and "Don't Let the Stars Get in Your Eyes", which became a major hit for both Perry Como and Skeets McDonald in 1952.

Leaving his prior label, 4 Star, in 1954, he started his own label, Winston, and continued releasing solo material, in addition to working as a deejay at Abilene station KCAD, until his death as a result of a heart attack in 1966, aged 46.

Legacy
He was inducted into the Country Music DJ Hall of Fame in 1994.

References
[ Slim Willet] at Allmusic

1919 births
1966 deaths
People from Dublin, Texas
American radio personalities
Singer-songwriters from Texas
Four Star Records artists
Apex Records artists
American country singer-songwriters
20th-century American singers
Hardin–Simmons University alumni
Country musicians from Texas